Ramon Airport (Arabic: مطار رامون) , named after Ilan and Assaf Ramon and unofficially also known as Eilat-Ramon Airport, is an international airport located in the Timna Valley in southern Israel. Ramon Airport is the second busiest in Israel (after Ben Gurion Airport) and has replaced the former Eilat Airport and Ovda Airport for civilian traffic. It also serves as the primary diversion airport in Israel.

Unlike the previous airport in Eilat, it has ample ramp space and a longer  runway, which allows large aircraft to land and park. The airport was originally due to open in April 2017, but the opening was pushed back and the airport opened on January 21, 2019. The Irish low-cost carrier Ryanair inaugurated the first international flight service with a Boeing 737–800 from Poznan, Poland, on March 4, 2019.

History

Background
Eilat Airport was established in 1949, when most of what would later be Eilat was empty. As the city developed, much of it was built around the airport. In the 1994 Peace Agreement between Israel and Jordan it was decided that operations would be transferred from Eilat Airport to Aqaba Airport in Jordan. The original plan was to rename Aqaba Airport as Aqaba–Eilat Peace International Airport. The agreement was never carried out, and an agreement between the two countries in March 1997, stipulated that domestic flights would continue to use Eilat Airport, whilst no further action to move international flights took place. Nonetheless, the construction of Ramon Airport angered Jordan, as this was seen by the Jordanian side as reneging on the promise of a joint airport made in the 1990s.

Removing the Eilat Airport from the city center was considered necessary for further development of Eilat, as it would allow, among other things, the construction of additional hotels close to the shoreline. It would also reduce noise pollution. The project is part of a larger plan to develop the city, which includes mega-projects such as moving the Port of Eilat to a location near the Jordanian border (for which removing the original airport is necessary), the Railway to Eilat, and upgrading the Arava Road.

The airport is named in memory of the first Israeli astronaut Ilan Ramon, who perished in the Space Shuttle Columbia disaster, and his son Assaf Ramon who died six years later when his F-16 fighter jet crashed in a training accident.

Planning and construction
The South District Planning and Construction Committee gave its approval for the project in 2003, and advanced planning was approved by the Israeli government in July 2010.

Construction was authorized on July 24, 2011, before advanced planning had been completed. The project's projected cost was ₪1.95 billion and it was funded partly by real estate revenue from selling the Eilat Airport's land. The planning budget, approved on May 6, 2010, was ₪56 million. There was a plan to make the airport a build-operate-transfer (BOT) project, but the Israel Airports Authority (IAA) objected, and the government authorized it to plan and oversee the project. Despite this, it was estimated that if the IAA took on the funding completely on its own, it would go bankrupt and default on its debts. Danya Cebus was selected to build the passenger terminal. The terminal was planned to feature a duty-free shop, a feature which was not present in Eilat Airport as Eilat Airport virtually only saw domestic flights. Mer Group was selected to provide command and control for the airport, including CCTV and perimeter protection.

In May 2013, the cornerstone was laid in a ceremony attended by government officials and members of the Ramon family. Construction began two weeks later.

The first test flight and landing in the airport took place on September 5, 2017. In January 2019, Jordan objected to Israel's opening of the airport, arguing that operation of the airport threatens the kingdom's airspace.

Ovda Airport which was built as a military airbase and is still used for that purpose had become the main airport for international flights to Southern Israel in the 2010s, as the facilities at Eilat Airport did not allow for the operation of larger and heavier planes. After Eilat Ramon Airport opened, Ovda was closed to civilian traffic.

Facilities
Aside from Highway 90, it may also someday be reachable from the center of the country and Eilat via a proposed high-speed rail line and a light rail line that will connect it to the city. A bus terminal and a park and ride facility was built next to the airport at a cost ₪400 million. The bus terminal will replace the Eilat Central Bus Station. When the airport opened in 2019, the new bus station was not completed, and shuttle services are available for passengers to connect from the airport to the city of Eilat. All in all, the airport will be able to handle 2 million passengers a year.

The airport features a  runway and has eight remote-parking stands for large aircraft and nine for turboprop airplanes.

Airlines and destinations
The following airlines operate regular scheduled and charter flights to and from Ramon Airport:

Statistics

See also
 Eilat Airport – the former "city" airport serving Eilat
 Ovda Airport – a military airbase in use as Southern Israel's international airport prior to the opening of Ramon Airport
 Aqaba Airport – just  great circle distance from Ramon Airport across the border in Jordan
 Taba Airport – across the border in Egypt, great circle distance 
 Railway to Eilat – proposed rail line that could serve the airport and/or reduce the need for domestic flights

References

External links

Official website
Memorial web site for Ilan Ramon – The First Israeli Astronaut
Renders at the Ministry of Transportation and Road Safety website
Plans at the Israel Land Administration website 
Show Ramon Airport construction site in Openstreetmap

Airports in Israel
Airports established in 2019
Eilat
2019 establishments in Israel